The Kamata Mosque is a mosque in Kamata District, Ōta, Tokyo, Japan.

History
The mosque was originally established in 2001.

Architecture
The mosque is housed in a 3-story building.

Transportation
The mosque is accessible within walking distance north of Kamata Station of JR East.

See also
 Islam in Japan
 List of mosques in Japan

References

External links
 

2001 establishments in Japan
Mosques completed in 2001
Mosques in Tokyo
Ōta, Tokyo